Russian Dolls is a 2005 romantic comedy-drama film, the sequel to  (2002) and the second part of the Spanish Apartment trilogy, which is concluded with Chinese Puzzle (2013). Cédric Klapisch wrote and directed the film, whose settings include Paris, London, Saint Petersburg and Moscow. Klapisch makes use of digital and split-screen effects in the film, as well as non-linear narrative.

Plot
The film begins with friends from L'Auberge espagnole meeting in Saint Petersburg at the wedding of Wendy's brother, William. Xavier begins to reminisce about the events of the past several years.

Xavier and Martine have split up and Martine has since had a child and become a committed environmental activist. For financial reasons, Xavier becomes a writer for pulp romantic novels and a ghostwriter, writing the autobiographies of celebrities. Martine criticizes his pulp novel work as being unrealistic and corny. Despite agreeing with this, Xavier replies that he earns good money. In Paris, Xavier has a brief affair with Kassia, a sales clerk from Senegal. When Xavier's grandfather asks about Xavier's fiancée, he asks his friend Isabelle, who is a lesbian, to pose as his fiancée.

In Paris, Xavier runs into Wendy, who has become an accomplished television writer. She is currently involved in an unhealthy relationship. A TV assignment later takes Xavier to London where he had requested to work with Wendy. Xavier is given the chance to ghost write an autobiography of Celia, a successful young model, whom he visits on a number of occasions. On one of these visits Xavier and Celia kiss before sleeping together while looking at the boats on the River Seine. The film shows Xavier and Wendy's attraction to each other growing before developing into a physical relationship. Xavier fights with Wendy's boyfriend which results in Xavier throwing him out.

Wendy's brother William has fallen in love with Natasha, a Russian ballerina. He spends a year learning Russian to try to win her over. He succeeds and moves to be with her in Saint Petersburg. Xavier and Wendy go to Russia to stay with William and Natasha. Natasha takes them to see the Street of Ideal Proportions, a street on which the buildings are the same height as the street's width and the street's length is ten times its width. Xavier and Wendy's relationship is going well until Celia calls Xavier and asks him to visit her as she is staying in Moscow. Xavier goes to visit Celia, telling Wendy that he has to see a publisher in Moscow. Xavier does not know that Wendy had looked at his cellphone and seen that the caller was another woman, not the publisher. Saying goodbye at the train station, Wendy tells Xavier what she has seen and explains her true feelings. Xavier is stunned and doesn't move from the train as Wendy walks away crying.

In Moscow, Celia and Xavier meet up and sleep together again but some of the attraction between them has gone. Later at a club she asks Xavier to get her a glass of milk. While he is at the bar, Celia runs into some old friends and reluctantly goes with them to another party. After failing to contact one another that night, Xavier and Celia never meet again.

Celia can be seen to represent an ideal woman, the type of unattainable fantasy that Xavier has been seeking his whole life. Xavier is aware that, like the Street of Ideal Proportions, she is ultimately uninteresting in her perfection. Xavier subsequently returns to St. Petersburg but finds that Wendy is avoiding him as she is convinced that he had an affair while in Moscow.

Towards the end of the film, the scene returns to William and Natasha marrying in front of family members and the characters introduced in L'Auberge Espagnole. Wendy's divorced parents begin to squabble during the reception. Wendy has been avoiding Xavier during the time leading up to the wedding, but she is unhappy at seeing her parents arguing and lets Xavier comfort her. He apologises for his past behaviour and the film ends with Xavier and Wendy embracing at Waterloo Station.

Cast

Reception 
The film was generally received well by critics, with a 72% fresh rating by the review aggregate website Rotten Tomatoes and a score of 67 from Metacritic.

Awards and honors

César Awards
 Best Actress in a Supporting Role: Cécile De France (won)
 Best Actress in a Supporting Role: Kelly Reilly (nominated)
 Best Editing: Francine Sandberg (nominated)

Soundtrack
Original film score composed by Loïk Dury and Laurent Levesque. The soundtrack album reached number 25 in France.

Track listing
 Da GrassRoots – "Démesure des mesures"
 Da GrassRoots – "Body Language"
 Kraked Unit – "En vrak"
 Olivier Montel – "Disco King"
 Kraked Unit – "Xavier la Fronde"
 El Fudge – "One Fudge"
 Kraked Unit – "La Ballade de Neus"
 Kraked Unit – "Celia's Kiss"
 Boban Markovic – "Ivzorski biseri"
 Beth Gibbons & Rustin Man – "Mysteries"
 Kraked Unit – "C koi ce bordel"
 Kraked Unit – "Poupées Russes"
 Spleen – "Bitches on the Ground"
 Kraked Unit – "La Reine des Queens"
 Track Addicts – "Dutchy"

References

External links
 
 
 
 
 

2005 films
2005 multilingual films
2005 romantic comedy-drama films
2000s English-language films
2000s French-language films
2000s Italian-language films
2000s Russian-language films
2000s Spanish-language films
British multilingual films
British romantic comedy-drama films
British sequel films
English-language French films
Films about writers
Films directed by Cédric Klapisch
Films featuring a Best Supporting Actress César Award-winning performance
Films set in London
Films set in Paris
Films set in Saint Petersburg
Films shot at Shepperton Studios
Films shot in London
Films shot in Paris
Films shot in Saint Petersburg
French multilingual films
French romantic comedy-drama films
French sequel films
StudioCanal films
2000s British films
2000s French films